The Settimana Ciclistica Lombarda is an Italian cycle road race. In 2007, the race was organised as a 2.1 event on the UCI Europe Tour, previously being a 2.2 race. It was previously known as Giro Ciclistico Bergamasco and Settimana Ciclistica Bergamasca.

While usually held in the Spring, the 2011 edition was held in late August. The 2012 edition was cancelled after several sponsors withdrew. When the race returned to the Europe Tour calendar in 2013, it was held in September.

List of winners

References

Cycle races in Italy
Recurring sporting events established in 1970
UCI Europe Tour races
Sport in Lombardy
1970 establishments in Italy